The horma was a tribute paid by subservient tribes to their protectors in traditional Sahrawi-Moorish society in today's Mauritania and Western Sahara in North Africa. The powerful Hassane warrior tribes would extract it from low-caste Znaga tribes, where each member was forced to personally pay an overlord in the dominant tribe. The forms and rates of horma varied throughout the region and through history, and was normally dependent on the relations of strength between the tribes involved. It could be paid in cattle, goods or services.

Further reading 
 Hodges, Tony (1983), Western Sahara: The Roots of a Desert War, Lawrence Hill Books
 Mercer, John (1976), Spanish Sahara, George Allen & Unwid Ltd
Pazzanita, Anthony G. and Hodge, Tony (1994), Historical Dictionary of Western Sahara, Scarecrow Press
 Thompson, Virginia and Adloff, Richard (1980), The Western Saharans. Background to Conflict, Barnes & Noble Books

Society of the Sahrawi Arab Democratic Republic
Society of Mauritania
Arab culture
Berbers in Mauritania
Berbers in Western Sahara